Budakhan Mindphone is the fourth EP by English electronic musician Squarepusher, released on 1 March 1999 by Warp. It follows in much the same vein as its predecessor Music Is Rotted One Note, and is often classified as an EP due to its relative brevity; the cover refers to it as "a mini-album".

Track listing

Charts

See also
 Squarepusher 1998–99: Budakhan Mindphone

References

Squarepusher albums
1999 albums
Warp (record label) albums